Viktoriya Zeynep Güneş or Viktoria Solntseva (born 19 June 1998) is a Ukraine-born Turkish (since 2014) swimmer. She currently represents Energy Standard in the International Swimming League.

Career

For Ukraine 
Solnceva competed for Ukraine at the 2013 FINA World Junior Swimming Championships in Dubai and the 2013 World Aquatics Championships in Barcelona. Solnceva is the current Ukrainian record holder in 100m and 200m breaststroke.

For Turkey 
Gunes competed in the 100m breaststroke in seniors at the 2015 World Aquatics Championships in Kazan, narrowly missing a semi-final birth as she placed 17th.  She represented Turkey in the 2016 Rio Summer Olympics, where she reached the semi-finals (top 16) of the 100m breaststroke, placing 15th in the preliminary heats. She swam in the heats of 400m medley 4.41.79 and did not advance. In the 100m breaststroke heats, she qualified for the semifinals with 1.07.14, however in the semifinals swam 1.07.41 and did not advance.

At the 2015 FINA World Junior Swimming Championships in Singapore, she represented Turkey, and won four gold medals. In the 200 meter breaststroke she broke the junior world record with a time of 2:19.64, just 0.53 off the senior world record. She also broke the junior world record in the 200 meter individual medley. FINA named her "female swimmer of the meet".

At the Budapest meet of the 2021 FINA Swimming World Cup, she took the gold medal in the 200 m breaststroke event,  and the bronze medal in the 200 m individual medley event. She won the gold medal in the 400 m individual medley event at the 2021 European Short Course Swimming Championships in Kazan, Russia, becoming the first Turkish swimmer to be a European champion. With her time of 4:30.45.4 she also improved her own Turkish record in this event.

International Swimming League 
In the Autumn of 2019, she was member of the inaugural International Swimming League swimming for the Energy Standard International Swim Club, who won the team title in Las Vegas, Nevada, in December.

Awards and honors
 FINA, Top 10 Moments: 2021 Swimming World Cup (#4)

References

Living people
1998 births
Sportspeople from Poltava
Turkish female breaststroke swimmers
Turkish female medley swimmers
Ukrainian female breaststroke swimmers
Ukrainian emigrants to Turkey
Naturalized citizens of Turkey
Turkish female swimmers
Swimmers at the 2016 Summer Olympics
Olympic swimmers of Turkey
Swimmers at the 2018 Mediterranean Games
Swimmers at the 2022 Mediterranean Games
Mediterranean Games gold medalists for Turkey
Mediterranean Games silver medalists for Turkey
Mediterranean Games bronze medalists for Turkey
Mediterranean Games medalists in swimming
Enkaspor swimmers
Swimmers at the 2020 Summer Olympics
Ukrainian female medley swimmers
Turkish people of Ukrainian descent
Islamic Solidarity Games competitors for Turkey
Islamic Solidarity Games medalists in swimming
21st-century Turkish women